Yohana Benítez (born February 26, 1987) is a Paraguayan beauty queen. On July 16, 2010 she was crowned Miss Universo Paraguay 2010, later she represented her country in the Miss Universe 2010 Pageant held in Las Vegas, U.S. on August 23, 2010.

About 
Benítez is a laws student from the Universidad Nacional de Asunción in Paraguay's capital city and the winner of Miss Universo Paraguay 2010. She is also a fashion model in her country having walked the runway during Asunción Fashion Week and Asunción Alta Moda.

External links
Article on Johana as Miss Universe Paraguay 2010.

1987 births
Living people
Miss Universe 2010 contestants
Paraguayan female models
Paraguayan beauty pageant winners